Snypaz are a Chicago hip hop group formed in 1993. Their first release was the 1995 cassette tape Ridin' High; their 1996 EP, My Life as a Snypa, sold 80,000 copies. Relocating to Houston, Texas, the group recorded tracks with Do or Die for their album Headz or Tailz, and soon after appeared on Scarface's 1998 album, My Homies. In 2001, Snypaz signed with Virgin Records and issued their major-label debut, Livin' in the Scope. The title single from this album peaked at #174 on the Billboard 200. Their latest appearance was in 2016 on Chicago artist Fatus Fee album, Tayo song titled Drug Love.

Discography

Studio albums
Livin' in the Scope (2001)
Snypaz (2002)

Extended plays
Servin Niggaz Young Playa Azz Zhit (1995)
My Life as a Snypa (1996)

References

External links

American hip hop groups
Midwest hip hop groups
Musical groups from Chicago
Gangsta rap groups